Östergarn is a populated area, a socken (not to be confused with parish), on the Swedish island of Gotland. It comprises the same area as the administrative Östergarn District, established on 1January 2016.

Geography 
Östergarn is situated on a peninsula on the central part of eastern Gotland. The area has several low plateaus, the two major ones are Grogarnsberget and Östergarnsberget. The medieval Östergarn Church is located in the socken. , Östergarn Church belongs to Östergarn parish in Romaklosters pastorat, along with the churches in Gammelgarn,
Kräklingbo, Anga and Ala.

The harbor village Katthammarsvik is on the north coast of Östergarn and the Herrvik fishing village is on the eastern tip of the peninsula. Along the southern coast is the Sandviken Natura 2000 nature reserve with its long, sandy beach.

One of the asteroids in the asteroid belt, 10815 Östergarn, is named after this place.

Climate

References

External links 

Objects from Östergarn at the Digital Museum by Nordic Museum

Populated places in Gotland County
Populated coastal places in Sweden